Tommy Grant (born August 29, 1986) is a Canadian former professional ice hockey player. He last played professionally for the Aalborg Pirates in the Metal Ligaen.

Playing career
On March 29, 2011, the New York Rangers of the National Hockey League signed Grant as an undrafted free agent to a two-year entry-level contract.

On January 16, 2013, the Rangers traded Grant to the San Jose Sharks, along with a conditional pick in the 2014 NHL Entry Draft, in exchange for Brandon Mashinter. Grant played with the Sharks affiliates, the Worcester Sharks and the San Francisco Bulls before he was not tendered a qualifying offer at season's end, releasing him to free agency.

During the 2013–14 season, Grant served as an Alternate captain for the Idaho Steelheads of the ECHL, contributing with 23 goals and 50 points in 64 games.

On June 11, 2014, Grant pursued a European career, agreeing to a one-year contract with Aalborg Pirates of the Danish Metal Ligaen.

References

External links

1986 births
Living people
Connecticut Whale (AHL) players
Canadian ice hockey left wingers
Idaho Steelheads (ECHL) players
Northeastern Huskies men's ice hockey players
Providence Bruins players
San Francisco Bulls players
Sportspeople from North Vancouver
Ice hockey people from British Columbia
Worcester Sharks players